Adner may refer to:

Anton Adner
Zohar Adner
Adner, Virginia

Disambiguation pages